Bergö is an island and former municipality of Finland in the Coastal Ostrobothnia region. The municipality of Bergö was incorporated with Maalahti in 1973. The island's only connection to the mainland is currently the year-round ferry.   

In December 1970, Bergö had a total population of 647 people, and 98% of the inhabitants were Swedish-speaking. At its highest population level in 1938, 948 people lived in the municipality. Before it was abolished, Bergö's land area was 33.8 km² and its neighbouring municipalities were Korsnäs, Maalahti and Petolahti.

Name 
Bergö's name was originally Vargö [], but the name of the island and village was changed to Bergö in 1830, probably because the original name was considered demeaning. The name of the island was documented as Wargö (1546)  and as Vargöö (1552), among others. The form Susiluoto ('Wolf Island') has also been used in Finnish.

History 
Originally, Bergö was four separate islands: Granön, Långön, Norrön and Holmen, which later merged due to post-glacial rebound. The history of Bergö Island goes all the way back to the late 1400s, when the first farmer was mentioned in 1495. In the 1500s, the island had nine houses, and about 40 inhabitants. Bergö, which was originally part of the parish of Mustasaari, shared a prayer house with Maalahti in 1652 and a chapel parish in 1848. Bergö parish became independent in 1908 and received its own vicar for the first time in 1911. The parish is now part of the Maalahti parish union, and of the Porvoo Communion. Bergö island was granted a ferry connection in 1962, when the ferry sailed from Vaasa only during the daytime. In 1979, this was replaced by a cable ferry, which runs from 5:30am to 00:10am every day; outside these times, the ferry can be called with buttons on the beaches.

The municipality of Bergö was merged with Maalahti in 1973.

Bergö's attractions include its wooden church, which was built in 1800-1802 and extended to its current appearance in 1852-1853.

Bergö village 
Bergö's only village is also called Bergö, and is approximately 3.15 km2 in size, with roughly 480 inhabitants. Its neighbourhoods include Bredhällan, Holme, Granön, Långön, Perisgrund and Södersund.

The population has remained relatively stable over the past ten years. There are about 60 jobs in the village and the proportion of those working elsewhere is about 50 percent. Most jobs are found in the service sector and the proportion of primary production has clearly decreased. In 2003, there were about 40 full-time fishermen in the village. The jobs provided by the Coast Guard and pilotage have largely disappeared, but the Bergö ferry connection still employs six people.

Infrastructure and services 
There is a fishing port on Ytterbådan, as well as marinas at Bredhällan, Perisgrund and at Norrsundet. A guest jetty and service house are located near the ferry berth. Bergö Båtklubb rf takes care of the small boat fairways in the Bergö archipelago.

Bergö has a ferry connection that operates according to a timetable. The bus connection from Bergö to Vaasa currently runs only once a day on weekdays. Two-thirds of households have access to the municipal water supply and sewerage system. The cable TV network is extended to the majority of households and the option of fast fibre connectivity is also available. The Petolahti-Bergö local television channel broadcasts two days a week.

Other services at Bergö include: a school for grades 1-6, day care, two grocery stores, bank, library, hairdressers, flower and gift stalls, café, medicine cabinet, post office, swimming beach, mini golf course, sauna, riding school. Bergö residents are very active in associations.

Population 
The following graph shows  the  population development of Bergö every ten years between 1880 and 1970.

According to the urban boundaries of 1960 and 1970, there  were no agglomerations in Bergö. Today, however, the  village of Bergö is  defined as an urban settlement.

Gallery

Notable residents 
 Albert Brommels (1891–1962), farmer and Member of Parliament

Bibliography

References 

Former municipalities of Finland